Contra-rotating, also referred to as coaxial contra-rotating, is a technique whereby parts of a mechanism rotate in opposite directions about a common axis, usually to minimise the effect of torque.  Examples include some aircraft propellers, resulting in the maximum power of a single piston or turboprop engine to drive two propellers in opposite rotation. Contra-rotating propellers are also common in some marine transmission systems, in particular for large speed boats with planing hulls. Two propellers are arranged one behind the other, and power is transferred from the engine via planetary gear transmission. The configuration can also be used in helicopter designs termed coaxial rotors, where similar issues and principles of torque apply.

Contra-rotating propellers should not be confused with counter-rotating propellers, a term which describes non-coaxial propellers on separate shafts; one turning clockwise and the other counter-clockwise.  Tandem-rotor helicopters such as the CH-47 Chinook also use a counter-rotating arrangement.

The efficiency of a contra-rotating propeller is somewhat offset by its mechanical complexity. Nonetheless, coaxial contra-rotating propellers and rotors are moderately common in military aircraft and naval applications, such as torpedoes, where the added maintenance cost is not a primary concern.

Aircraft propulsion and lift

While several nations experimented with contra-rotating propellers in aircraft, only the United Kingdom and Soviet Union produced them in large numbers. The U.S. worked with several prototypes, including the tail-sitting Convair XFY and Lockheed XFV "Pogo" VTOL fighters, but jet engine technology was advancing rapidly and the designs were deemed unnecessary.

Some helicopters use contra-rotating coaxial rotors mounted one above the other.  The H-43 Huskie helicopter uses non-coaxial intermeshing rotors turning in opposite directions.

The F-35B variant of the F-35 Lightning II strike fighter uses a lift fan with contra-rotating blades.

Marine propulsion 

Contra-rotating propellers have benefits when providing thrust for boats for the same reasons. ABB provided an azimuth thruster for ShinNihonkai Ferries in form of the CRP Azipod, claiming efficiency gains from the propeller (about 10% increase) and a simpler hull design. Volvo Penta have launched the IPS (Inboard Performance System), an integrated diesel, transmission and pulling contra-rotating propellers for motor yachts.

Torpedoes have commonly used contra-rotating propellers to give the maximum possible speed within a limited diameter as well as counteracting the torque that would otherwise tend to cause the torpedo to rotate around its own longitudinal axis.

Advantages
The propeller-induced heeling moment is compensated (negligible for larger ships).
More power can be transmitted for a given propeller radius.
The propeller efficiency is increased by recovering energy from the tangential (rotational) flow from the leading propeller.  Tangential flow does not contribute to thrust, conversion of tangential to axial flow increases both thrust and overall system efficiency.

Disadvantages
The mechanical installation of coaxial contra-rotating shafts is complicated and expensive and requires more maintenance.
The hydrodynamic gains are partially reduced by mechanical losses in shafting.

Contra-rotating propellers are used on torpedoes due to the natural torque compensation and are also used in some motor  boats. The cost of boring out the outer shafts and problems of mounting the inner shaft bearings are not worth pursuing in case of normal ships.

See also 
 Use in marine propulsion

References

External links
Two Propellers in Tandem Turning in Opposite Ways Give Warplane New Speed''

Propellers